The PFL 1 mixed martial arts event for the 2021 season of the Professional Fighters League was held on April 23, 2021. This was the first regular season event of the tournament and included fights in the Featherweight and Lightweight divisions.

Background
The event was headlined by a lightweight clash between the former UFC and WEC Lightweight champion Anthony Pettis and the UFC veteran Clay Collard. In the co-main event, the two-time PFL Lightweight tournament winner Natan Schulte faced the former Bellator Lightweight title challenger Marcin Held.

The remaining two fights of the main card were held in the featherweight division: former two-time PFL Featherweight champion Lance Palmer faced the 2011 NCAA Division I champion Bubba Jenkins and Movlid Khaybulaev was to face Jason Soares. However, Soares was removed from the PFL season and his fight against Movlid Khaibulaev after failing medicals. He was replaced by Lazar Stojadinovic.

A lightweight bout between Joilton Lutterbach and Olivier Aubin-Mercier was planned for this event, however Olivier pulled out due to injury and was replaced by Former Titan FC lightweight champion Raush Manfio. Olivier is expected to return in June.

Johnny Case was expected to face Loik Radzhabov at this event. However, due to an arrest, Case had to pull out and was replaced by Alexander Martinez.

At weigh-ins, Mikhail Odintsov weighed in at 156.4 pounds, missing weight by .4 pounds. He was fined 20 percent of his purse, ineligible to win playoff points, given a walkover loss, and was penalized one point in the standings. Akhmet Aliev received a walkover win regardless of bout outcome but is eligible to gain stoppage points.

Results

Standings After Event
The PFL points system is based on results of the match.  The winner of a fight receives 3 points.  If the fight ends in a draw, both fighters will receive 1 point. The bonus for winning a fight in the first, second, or third round is 3 points, 2 points, and 1 point respectively. The bonus for winning in the third round requires a fight be stopped before 4:59 of the third round.  No bonus point will be awarded if a fighter wins via decision.  For example, if a fighter wins a fight in the first round, then the fighter will receive 6 total points. A decision win will result in three total points.  If a fighter misses weight, the opponent (should they comply with weight limits) will receive 3 points due to a walkover victory, regardless of winning or losing the bout, with the fighter who missed weight being deducted 1 standings point;  if the non-offending fighter subsequently wins with a stoppage, all bonus points will be awarded. A fighter who was unable to compete for any reason, will receive a 1-point penalty (-1 point in the standings). The fighters who made weight will not receive a walkover, but will earn points and contracted purse amounts based on their performance in the altered matchup.

Lightweight

Featherweight

See also
List of PFL events
List of current PFL fighters

References

Professional Fighters League
2021 in mixed martial arts
April 2021 sports events in the United States
Events in Atlantic City, New Jersey